Legazpi is an administrative neighborhood (barrio) of Madrid belonging to the district of Arganzuela. As of 1 February 2020, it has a population of 19,820.

References 

Wards of Madrid
Arganzuela